The Flintstones (also known as The Flintstones Movie or The Flintstones: The Live-Action Movie in the working title) is a 1994 American family comedy film directed by Brian Levant and written by Tom S. Parker, Jim Jennewein, and Steven E. de Souza based on the 1960–1966 animated television series of the same name. The film stars John Goodman as Fred Flintstone, Rick Moranis as Barney Rubble, Elizabeth Perkins as Wilma Flintstone, and Rosie O'Donnell as Betty Rubble, along with Kyle MacLachlan as Cliff Vandercave, a villainous executive-vice president of Fred's company, Halle Berry as Sharon Stone, his seductive secretary, and Elizabeth Taylor (in her final theatrical film appearance), as Pearl Slaghoople, Wilma's mother. The B-52's performed their version of the cartoon's theme song, playing themselves as the BC-52's.

The film, shot in California, was theatrically released on May 27, 1994, it received mostly negative reviews from critics but earned almost $342 million worldwide against a $46 million budget. Audiences and fans praised its faithfulness to its source material, visual effects, costume design, art direction, and performances (particularly Goodman as Fred), but criticized the storyline, tone (which they deemed too mature for family audiences) and casting choices on O'Donnell and Taylor. A tie-in promotion with McDonald's was made to promote the film. The movie was originally acquired by New Line Cinema, but then sold to Universal Pictures.

A prequel titled The Flintstones in Viva Rock Vegas was released in 2000.

Plot 

In prehistoric suburban Bedrock, Slate & Co.'s new vice-president Cliff Vandercave and secretary Sharon Stone discuss their plan to swindle the company of its vast fortune, pin the theft on an employee, and flee. Fred Flintstone loans his best friend and neighbor Barney Rubble money so that he and his wife Betty can adopt a little boy named Bamm-Bamm, who can only pronounce his own name. Though initially hard to control because of his super strength, Bamm-Bamm eventually warms up to his new family and befriends Fred’s daughter Pebbles. Despite his mother-in-law Pearl Slaghoople's objections, Fred's wife Wilma remains supportive of his decision to loan the Rubbles money.

Cliff holds an aptitude test with the worker with the highest mark becoming the company's new vice president. Barney gets the highest score but switches his paper with Fred, whom he knows will fail. Fred receives the promotion, complete with executive perks such as a luxurious office and Stone appointed as his secretary. To test Fred’s willingness to follow orders, Cliff asks him to dismiss Barney who, with Fred's test paper, has the lowest score in the company. Though Fred is unwilling to fire him, Cliff warns him that he will fire both of them. Fred reluctantly accepts, but continues to help Barney support his family, even inviting the Rubbles to live with them so that they can rent out their house. However, Fred's job and newfound wealth eventually hinder his relationships with Wilma and the Rubbles. Cliff eventually tricks Fred into dismissing the other workers, over the objections of his office Dictabird. Later, Barney confronts Fred after seeing worker riots on the news and, after revealing that he switched tests with Fred, moves out with Betty. Wilma and Pebbles also leave for Pearl's house, leaving Fred behind.

Fred goes to the quarry, discovers Cliff's plan, and tries getting Mr. Slate to fire Cliff. However, having manipulated the events to make it look as if Fred stole the money, Cliff has reported the theft to the police. Fred flees, but a manhunt ensues by both the police and the fired workers. Wilma and Betty see this on the news and break into Slate & Co. to get the Dictabird, the only witness who can clear Fred's name, unaware that Cliff saw them from his office window. As a disguised Fred enters the workers' cave, he is discovered and the workers try hanging him. When Barney shows up as a sno-cone truck driver, the workers also try to hang him as well when he admits his role in the events. Fred and Barney reconcile before Wilma, Betty and the Dictabird save them and Wilma tells the workers that Fred was framed by Cliff.

When the Flintstones and Rubbles return home, they find it burglarized with Dino and Pearl tied up and Pebbles and Bamm-Bamm gone. The group finds a note from Cliff saying that he will trade the children for the Dictabird. Fred and Barney confront Cliff at the quarry, where Cliff has tied Pebbles and Bamm-Bamm to a huge machine. Though they hand him the Dictabird, Cliff activates the machine to stall them. Barney rescues the children while Fred destroys the machine. The Dictabird escapes from Cliff and lures him back to the quarry, where Stone incapacitates him, having had a change of heart after learning of Cliff's plan to betray her. The police, Wilma, Betty, and Mr. Slate arrive and Cliff attempts to escape, but he is petrified by a substance falling from the machine.

Fred and the Dictabird tell the police of Cliff's actions and all charges against Fred are dropped. Impressed with the substance that Fred inadvertently created by destroying the machine, Mr. Slate dubs the substance "concrete" in honor of his daughter Concretia and declares the stone age over. Mr. Slate asks for the workers to be rehired and makes plans to produce the concrete with Fred leading its division. Having experienced the negatives of wealth and status, Fred declines the offer and asks that the workers be given two weeks paid leave as part of their salary, preferring to return to his old life.

Cast 
 John Goodman as Fred Flintstone
 Rick Moranis as Barney Rubble
 Elizabeth Perkins as Wilma Flintstone
 Rosie O'Donnell as Betty Rubble
 Kyle MacLachlan as Cliff Vandercave
 Halle Berry as Miss Sharon Stone
 Elizabeth Taylor as Pearl Slaghoople
 Mel Blanc as the voice of Dino (archive dialogue)
 Elaine and Melanie Silver as Pebbles Flintstone
 Hlynur and Marinó Sigurðsson as Bamm-Bamm Rubble
 Dann Florek as Mr. Slate
 Richard Moll as Hoagie
 Irwin Keyes as Joe Rockhead
 Jim Doughan as Maitre d'
 Harvey Korman as the voice of Dictabird: Korman was the voice of The Great Gazoo from the original animated series.
 Jonathan Winters as Grizzled Man, a co-worker of Fred and Barney's
 Jack O'Halloran as Yeti
 The B-52's as The BC-52's
 Jean Vander Pyl as Mrs. Feldspar: Vander Pyl was the voice of Wilma in the original animated series
 Laraine Newman as Susan Rock
 Sheryl Lee Ralph as Mrs. Pyrite
 Jay Leno as host of Bedrock's Most Wanted
 William Hanna as a boardroom executive
 Joseph Barbera as a man driving a Mersandes
 Sam Raimi as Cliff Vandercave look-alike
 Alan Blumenfeld as Fred Flintstone look-alike
 Messiri Freeman as Miss Stone look-alike
 Elizabeth Daily as the voice of Bamm-Bamm (dubbed; uncredited)
 Russi Taylor as the voice of Pebbles (dubbed; uncredited)

Production

Development and writing 
In 1985, producers Keith Barish and Joel Silver bought the rights for a live-action feature film version of The Flintstones and commissioned Steven E. de Souza to write a script with Richard Donner hired to direct. De Souza's script submitted in September 1987 was eventually rejected and in October 1989 a new script by Daniel and Joshua Goldin was submitted. Peter Martin Wortmann and Robert Conte submitted another draft in March 1990 before Mitch Markowitz was hired to write a script. Said to be a cross of The Grapes of Wrath, Markowitz commented that "I don't even remember it that well, but Fred and Barney leave their town during a terrible depression and go across the country, or whatever that damn prehistoric thing is, looking for jobs. They wind up in trailer parks trying to keep their families together. They exhibit moments of heroism and poignancy". Markowitz's version was apparently too sentimental for director Donner, who disliked it. A further draft was then submitted and revised by Jeffrey Reno and Ron Osbourne in 1991 and 1992. Eventually, the rights were bought by Amblin Entertainment and Steven Spielberg who, after working with Goodman on Always, was determined to cast him in the lead as Fred. Brian Levant was hired as director, knowing he was the right person because of his love for the original series. They knew he was an avid fan of the series because of his Flintstones items collection and the knowledge he had from the series.

When Levant was hired, all previous scripts were thrown out. In May 1992, Michael J. Wilson submitted a four-page story that became the basis for the film. This was turned into a script by Jim Jennewein and Tom S. Parker. A meeting of Levant, Bruce Cohen, Jason Hoffs and Kate Barker gave notes to Gary Ross, who produced another draft. Levant then recruited what he called an "all-star writing team" which consisted of his writer friends from television shows such as Family Ties, Night Court, and Happy Days. Levant described as "a sitcom on steroids, just trying to improve it". The writers, dubbed the Flintstone Eight, were Al Aidekman, Cindy Begel, Lloyd Garver, David Silverman, Stephen Sustarsic, Nancy Steen, Neil Thompson plus Levant. The group wrote a new draft but four more round table sessions ensued, each of which was attended by new talent, including Rob Dames, Lenny Ripps, Fred Fox Jr., Dava Savel, Lon Diamond, David Richardson, Roy Teicher, Richard Gurman, Michael J. Digaetano and Ruth Bennett. Lowell Ganz and Babaloo Mandel worked on it next with Levant, taking home a reported $100,000 for just two days work. Rick Moranis was also present at Levant's roundtables, and later described the film as "one of those scripts that had about 18 writers". Levant made eight more revisions before finally registering a shooting script on August 7, 1993. Of the 35 writers, the Flintstone Eight were submitted for arbitration by the Writers Guild of America plus Wilson for story credit; however, credit was given to the first script by De Souza and to Jennewein and Parker for their drafts.

The effects for Dino, the Dictabird and other prehistoric creatures were provided by Jim Henson's Creature Shop while most of the film's CGI effects were provided by Industrial Light & Magic after Levant was impressed by their work on the dinosaurs in Jurassic Park (another Universal/Amblin production released the previous year).

Casting 
John Candy, Jim Belushi, Dan Aykroyd, Bill Murray, and Chevy Chase were all considered for the role of Fred Flintstone. The last four actors were all deemed too skinny and a fat suit was deemed too inappropriate to be used. Goodman felt he was "sandbagged" into the role of Flintstone years earlier at the table read for the film Always, when Steven Spielberg announced: "Ladies and Gentlemen, I'd like to say something before we start: I've found my Fred Flintstone". Goodman said it was "not a role I was looking forward to doing" but said the experience was "fun". Had Goodman turned the role down, the film would not have been made. Geena Davis, Faith Ford, and Catherine O'Hara were all considered for the role of Wilma, but Elizabeth Perkins eventually won the role. Danny DeVito was the original first choice for Barney, but he turned down the role as he felt he was too gruff to do the character properly and reportedly suggested Rick Moranis for the role. DeVito was also considered for Fred Flintstone. Although Janine Turner was considered, Rosie O'Donnell won the role of Betty Rubble with her impersonation of the cartoon character's signature giggle. Both Tracey Ullman and Daphne Zuniga were also considered for the role. Sharon Stone was to play Miss Stone, but turned it down because of scheduling conflicts. The role was also offered to Nicole Kidman. Both Audrey Meadows and Elizabeth Montgomery were considered for the role of Pearl Slaghoople.

Filming 
Principal photography began on May 17, 1993, and wrapped on August 20, 1993. Parts of the film were shot at Glen Canyon in Utah as well as Los Angeles County, California. Sets that resembled a complete street from Bedrock were constructed adjacent to Vasquez Rocks in California. Before being totally demolished, visitors could tour the location.

Reception

Box office 
Despite the negative reviews, The Flintstones was a box office success, grossing $130,531,208 domestically, including the $37,182,745 it made during its 4-day Memorial Day opening weekend in 1994 (a then-record gross for the Memorial Day weekend). It performed even better internationally, making another $211,100,000 internationally, for a total of $341,631,208 worldwide, more than seven times its $46 million budget. Along with Lethal Weapon 3, the film also had the biggest May opening weekend until it was taken by Twister in 1996. In the United Kingdom, it had the second highest opening week at the time behind Jurassic Park, with a gross of $8.7 million. In Mexico it had a record opening with $4.9 million in four days. In Australia, it grossed $2 million in its opening weekend, also the second highest at the time behind Jurassic Park. In Italy, it grossed $4.8 million in its first six days, again the second biggest opener in Italy at the time behind Jurassic Park. It set opening records in Hungary and Poland. It went on to gross over $15 million in Italy, $35 million in Germany and $31 million in the United Kingdom. It did not perform well in France or South Korea.

Critical response 
 On Metacritic the film has a weighted average score of 38 out of 100, which indicates "generally unfavorable reviews", based on 15 reviews. Audiences surveyed by CinemaScore gave the film a grade "B+" on scale of A+ to F.

On Siskel & Ebert & the Movies, Roger Ebert of the Chicago Sun-Times and his colleague Gene Siskel of the Chicago Tribune gave the film two thumbs down. Ebert gave it 2.5 stars out of 4 in his newspaper review, and Siskel gave it 1.5 stars out of 4 in his newspaper review. They both mentioned that its main storylines (embezzlement, mother-in-law problems, office politics and extra-marital affairs) were storylines for adult films, and ones that children would not be able to understand.

Kenneth Turan of the Los Angeles Times wrote that the film never had much potential and "has been carefully designed to be as bright and insubstantial as a child’s toy balloon". Comparing the film to The Addams Family, he called both films "clever, lively and ultimately wearying pieces of showy Hollywood machinery" that favor visuals over writing.

Caryn James of The New York Times wrote that Goodman "goes a long way toward carrying The Flintstones over a script that is essentially a bunch of rock jokes and puns stretched to feature-film length", but James also said the film is too faithful to its 1960s source material and lacks modern pop culture references.

Todd McCarthy of Variety said that "with all manner of friendly beasts, a superenergetic John Goodman and a colorful supporting cast inhabiting a Bedrock that resembles a Stone Age version of Steven Spielberg suburbia, this live-action translation of the perennial cartoon favorite is a fine popcorn picture for small fry, and perfectly inoffensive for adults".

Michael Wilmington of the Chicago Tribune wrote that the film resembled "a mountain of production, a rock of a cast, [and] a pebble of thought".

A few reviews were positive, including one from Richard Schickel of Time, who said that "nothing has been lost—or worse, inflated out of proportion" in the adaptation.  He said it "doesn't feel overcalculated, over-produced or overthought".

In a 1997 interview, Joseph Barbera, co-founder of Hanna-Barbera Productions and co-creator of The Flintstones, stated that, although he was impressed by the film's visuals, he felt the story "wasn't as good as I could have made it".

Year-end lists 
 1st worst – Desson Howe, The Washington Post
 1st worst – Todd Anthony, Miami New Times
 3rd worst – Janet Maslin, The New York Times
 5th worst – Dan Craft, The Pantagraph
 10th worst – Peter Travers, Rolling Stone
 Worst films (not ranked) – Jeff Simon, The Buffalo News

Accolades 

O'Donnell won the Golden Raspberry Award for Worst Supporting Actress for her performance in this film. The film also won Worst Screenplay and was nominated for two others: Taylor as Golden Raspberry Award for Worst Supporting Actress (the second performance in the film nominated for this award) and for the film as Worst Remake or Sequel. At the 1994 Stinkers Bad Movie Awards, the film was nominated for Worst Resurrection of a TV Show and Worst Actress for O'Donnell. The film also received four Saturn Award nominations, including Best Fantasy Film, Best Costume Design and Best Supporting Actress for O'Donnell's and Berry's performances.

Marketing 
McDonald's marketed a number of Flintstones promotions for the film, including the return of the McRib sandwich and the "Grand Poobah Meal" combo with it, a line of premium glass mugs, and toys based on characters and locations from the film. In the commercials and released items for the Flintstones promotion, McDonald's was renamed "RocDonald's" with stone age imagery, similarly to other businesses and proper names in the Flintstones franchise. The week the film was released, MTV aired a block of The Grind with Eric Nies at the film's Bedrock set with dancers in cave outfits performing to hit music at the time from Ace of Base, Was (Not Was), Warren G and Nate Dogg while Eric asked the dancers themed trivia questions from the show and encouraged the viewers to purchase the film's soundtrack. The Flintstones: The Movie, a video game based on the film, was developed by Ocean software and released for the Super Nintendo Entertainment System, Game Boy and Mega Drive/Genesis (Sega Channel exclusive) in 1995. In the United Kingdom, Tetley promoted TV commercials with audio from the film, including mugs starring characters from the film. Jurassic Park, the name of another movie, was also seen briefly as a park in the film.

Home media 
The film was released on VHS and LaserDisc on November 8, 1994, and on DVD on March 16, 1999. It was released on Blu-ray on August 19, 2014.

Video game 

A video game based on the film was released for the Game Boy, Super Nintendo Entertainment System and Sega Channel in both 1994 and 1995 respectively, developed by Ocean Software (SNES), Twilight (GB), Hi-Tech (SC) and published by Ocean Software. In the game, the player takes control of Fred Flintstone and has to rescue  Wilma, Barney, Pebbles and Bam-Bam from Cliff Vandercave.

A Sega Genesis version developed by Foley Hi-Tech and published by Ocean Software was also planned, but was later canceled and was released on the Sega Channel instead.

Prequel 

A prequel, The Flintstones in Viva Rock Vegas, was released in 2000. The original main cast did not reprise their roles of the characters, though O'Donnell provided the voice of an octopus who gave massages to younger versions of Wilma and Betty. Irwin Keyes returned as Joe Rockhead, the only cast member to reprise his role from the first film. Like the first film, it received negative reviews, but unlike the original film, it was a box office flop.

See also 
 List of American films of 1994
 Theatrically released films based on Hanna-Barbera cartoons

References

External links 

 
 
 

The Flintstones films
1994 films
1990s buddy comedy films
1990s children's comedy films
Amblin Entertainment films
Golden Raspberry Award winning films
American films with live action and animation
American children's comedy films
Films about dinosaurs
Films about adoption
Films directed by Brian Levant
Puppet films
Films shot in Los Angeles County, California
Live-action films based on animated series
Films scored by David Newman
Ten-pin bowling films
Universal Pictures films
Films shot in Utah
1994 comedy films
Films with screenplays by Steven E. de Souza
Films with screenplays by Jim Jennewein
Films produced by Bruce Cohen
1990s English-language films
1990s American films